Hanumanthanagar most often refers to:

 Hanumanthanagar, Bengaluru, a locality in Bangalore, India
 Hanumanthanagar, Mysuru, a locality in Mysore, India
 Hanumanthanagar, Kolar Gold Fields, Kolar, India